Tristan White (born 11 July 1990) is an Australian field hockey player. He competed in the men's hockey tournament at the 2014 Commonwealth Games where he won a gold medal.

References

External links
 
 
 
 

1990 births
Living people
Commonwealth Games gold medallists for Australia
Australian male field hockey players
Field hockey players at the 2014 Commonwealth Games
Commonwealth Games medallists in field hockey
Medallists at the 2014 Commonwealth Games